Rajat Suri is a Canadian-American entrepreneur. He is the co-founder and CEO of Presto.

Education 
In 2007, Suri received a bachelor's in chemical engineering and economics from the University of Waterloo. He was a Ph.D./M.B.A. candidate at Massachusetts Institute of Technology (MIT) until he dropped out to pursue a career as an entrepreneur.

Career

Zimride / Lyft 
Suri was a co-founder of Zimride, which later became Lyft and grew to be the second-largest ridesharing company in the United States.

Presto 
In 2008, while trying to split a bill with his friends, Suri was inspired to create a product that allowed restaurant customers to order and pay through a tablet. In October 2008, he founded Presto, then known by its legal name E la Carte in Massachusetts. The company is a major player in the customer-facing technology market for full-service and quick-service restaurants.

Presto Technologies, Inc. 
On November 10, 2021, Suri announced that Presto entered into a definitive merger agreement with Ventoux CCM Acquisition Corp. ("Ventoux") (NASDAQ: VTAQ), a special-purpose acquisition company that will result in Presto becoming a public company.  Upon closing, the company will be renamed Presto Technologies, Inc. and expects to list its common stock on Nasdaq. The combined company has a pro forma equity value of approximately $1 billion.

References 

Living people

Year of birth missing (living people)